Peperomia kamerunana is a species of plant in the family Piperaceae. It is found in Cameroon and Equatorial Guinea. Its natural habitats are subtropical or tropical moist lowland forests and subtropical or tropical moist montane forests. It is threatened by habitat loss.

References

kamerunana
Endangered plants
Taxonomy articles created by Polbot